Harry Williams was an American Negro league third baseman in the 1920s.

Williams played for the Baltimore Black Sox in 1920 and 1921. In four recorded career games, he posted three hits in 15 plate appearances.

References

External links
Baseball statistics and player information from Baseball-Reference Black Baseball Stats and Seamheads

Year of birth missing
Year of death missing
Place of birth missing
Place of death missing
Baltimore Black Sox players
Baseball third basemen